The Cairo Declaration was the outcome of the Cairo Conference in Cairo, Egypt, on 27 November 1943.  President Franklin Roosevelt of the United States, Prime Minister Winston Churchill of the United Kingdom, and Generalissimo Chiang Kai-shek of the Republic of China were present. The declaration developed ideas from the 1941 Atlantic Charter, which was issued by the Allies of World War II to set goals for the post-war order. The Cairo Communiqué was broadcast through radio on 1 December 1943.

Text
"The several military missions have agreed upon future military operations against Japan. The Three Great Allies expressed their resolve to bring unrelenting pressure against their brutal enemies by sea, land, and air. This pressure is already rising."

"The Three Great Allies are fighting this war to restrain and punish the aggression of Japan. They covet no gain for themselves and have no thought of territorial expansion. It is their purpose that Japan shall be stripped of all the islands in the Pacific which she has seized or occupied since the beginning of the first World War in 1914, and that all the territories Japan has stolen from the Chinese, such as Manchuria, Formosa, and The Pescadores, shall be restored to the Republic of China. Japan will also be expelled from all other territories which she has taken by violence and greed. The aforesaid three great powers, mindful of the enslavement of the people of Korea, are determined that in due course Korea shall become free and independent."

"With these objects in view the three Allies, in harmony with those of the United Nations at war with Japan, will continue to persevere in the serious and prolonged operations necessary to procure the unconditional surrender of Japan."

Impact 
The Cairo Declaration is cited in Clause Eight (8) of the Potsdam Declaration, which is referred to by the Japanese Instrument of Surrender.

The governments of the People's Republic of China and the Republic of China cites the Cairo Declaration as one of the bases for the One-China Principle that Taiwan and Penghu are part of China.

See also
 Cairo Conference
 Second Sino-Japanese War (1937–1945)
 Potsdam Declaration (July 1945)
 General Order No. 1 (August 1945)
 Japanese Instrument of Surrender (September 1945)
 Korea Retrocession (August 1945)
 Taiwan Retrocession (October 1945)
 Treaty of San Francisco (1951)
Cairo Declaration (film)

References

External links
 Text of the Cairo Communiqué in the Japanese National Diet Library
 FRUS1943 Cairo Conference University of Wisconsin Digital Collection
 Cairo Declaration Department of State 
 Cairo Declaration Yale University
 Cairo Formosa Declaration Out of Date, Says Churchill; CHURCHILL CALLS PLEDGE OUTDATED By Drew Middleton special To the New York Times. Feb. 2, 1955

Aftermath of World War II
1943 in Egypt
November 1943 events
1943 documents